The Bentley London is a luxury hotel in London, England, located in South Kensington. The hotel contains 64 rooms. The building was constructed in 1880, joined the Hilton Group as a franchise in October 2008 and was added to the  Waldorf-Astoria collection on 12 March 2009. As of January 2012, The Bentley Hotel is a standalone hotel with no association with Hilton or Waldorf Astoria.

Architecture
The Bentley London is built from 600 tonnes of marble imported from Turkey, Italy and Northern Africa. It was constructed behind the façade of three adjacent Georgian townhouses.

Gallery

References

Hotels in London
Hotels established in 1880